Wat Phaya Mangrai ("Temple of King Mangrai") is a ruined temple located within the Wiang Kum Kam archaeological site, very close to the south-eastern side of Wat Phrachao Ong Dam. It is named after the historic figure Mangrai the Great.

References

 Oliver Hargreave: Exploring Chiang Mai, City, Valley & Mountains. Within Books, 4th Edition, 2013. 

Phaya Mangrai
History of Chiang Mai